Alex Teodorani (born 21 September 1991) is an Italian professional footballer who plays as a goalkeeper.

Career
Born in Rimini, Romagna, Teodorani started his career at A.C. Cesena. On 14 January 2011 he was signed by A.C. Bellaria – Igea Marina, as part of the deal that saw Aldo Junior Simoncini move in the opposite direction. He spent the first half of the following on loan with SPAL 1907, and the second half of the season on loan at Carrarese Calcio. On 9 August 2012, he was signed by A.C. Pavia. On 25 July 2013, Teodorani moved to A.C. Monza–Brianza in another temporary deal.

References

External links
 AIC profile (data by football.it) 

Italian footballers
A.C. Cesena players
A.C. Bellaria Igea Marina players
S.P.A.L. players
Carrarese Calcio players
F.C. Pavia players
A.C. Monza players
Association football goalkeepers
Italy youth international footballers
Serie C players
Sportspeople from Rimini
1991 births
Living people
Footballers from Emilia-Romagna